The Outsiders is a team of superheroes that appear in comic books published by DC Comics.

The roster of the team has changed a great deal over the years. These roster lists are of the members during the Outsiders' various incarnations by team iteration. The codenames listed under Character are those used when that character was a member of the team. Bolded names indicate current team members.

Joined in refers to the issue where the character first appeared as a member of the team. It is not necessarily the first appearance of the character in print, nor the story depicting how the character joined the team.

Pre-Rebirth

DC Rebirth

In other media 

Outsider members